Paul Thompson (born  1 January 1951) is Professor of Employment Studies at the University of Stirling, Scotland. He was formerly Professor of Organisational Analysis and Vice Dean Research at the University of Strathclyde. 

Professor Thompson is one of the main theorists of Labour process theory and is Convenor of the Steering Group of the International Labour Process Conference. He is on the editorial board and a former Editor of Renewal, a journal committed to exploring radical social democratic policies in the British Labour Party.

In his academic work Thompson has been critical of traditional managerialist approaches to organisation theory and the post-structuralist approaches of critical management studies.

References

1951 births
Living people
Academics of the University of Strathclyde